The prime minister is the most senior member of the cabinet in a parliamentary system of government. 

It may also refer to:

The Prime Minister (novel), a novel by Anthony Trollope
The Prime Minister (film), a biography of former British Prime Minister Benjamin Disraeli
The Prime Minister (film), original title De Premier, British title President Under Siege  a thriller by Erik Van Looy
Prime Minister (TV series) (also known as Ekipa), a 2007 Polish political drama
Prime Minister (band), a Russian band
Prime Minister (rapper), a Christian rap/hip-hop artist